David Félix (born 18 March 1971 in Paris) is a French karateka who won multiple medals at karate's top competitions: the European Karate Championships and the World Karate Championships.

 Gold medalist at the 1998 World Karate Championships at men's kumite75kg
 Bronze medalist at the 2000 World Karate championships at men's kumite75kg
 Gold medalist at the 2001 European Karate Championships at men's kumite open

References

External links
 David Felix at Karaterec.com

1971 births
Living people
Sportspeople from Paris
French male karateka
World Games gold medalists
Competitors at the 2001 World Games
Mediterranean Games bronze medalists for France
Mediterranean Games medalists in karate
Competitors at the 2001 Mediterranean Games
World Games medalists in karate
20th-century French people
21st-century French people